Jimmy Mundy (born 2 September 1948) is an English footballer, who played as a midfielder in the Football League for Manchester City and Oldham Athletic in late 1960s and early 1970s.

References

Manchester City F.C. players
Association football midfielders
Oldham Athletic A.F.C. players
Bangor City F.C. players
English Football League players
1948 births
Living people
People from Wythenshawe
English footballers